Gar Munara (Urdu: گاڑمنارہ) is a village located on the bank of the Indus River, in Swabi, Khyber Pakhtunkhwa, Pakistan, near the town of Marghuz. Thousands of visitors across Pakistan visit Gar Munara every year, especially in summer to enjoy the Indus River. It has a population of around 5,000. Most of the people are government workers or public servants. Many of them go abroad for work. The village's only bank, HBL, is located in the center of the village. The main crops are wheat, corn, sugarcane, and tobacco. Resorts in Gar Munara include Rahat Khan Bangla and Ameer Sher Khan Bangla. Gar Munara village is surrounded by several other villages: Dhok to its east, Moosa Banda to its west, and Marghuz to its north, with the Indus River to its south. The literacy rate is high in this area. There is one matriculation school for boys, and one for girls. There is also one primary school for boys and one for girls. A new college for girls.

HBL Gar Munara Ph# 092-938480463
and Union Council of Swabi District in Khyber-Pakhtunkhwa.

References

Populated places in Swabi District
Union Councils of Swabi District